André Lepère (9 September 1878 – 26 March 1964) was a French cyclist. He competed at the 1908 Summer Olympics and the 1912 Summer Olympics.

References

External links
 

1878 births
1964 deaths
French male cyclists
Olympic cyclists of France
Cyclists at the 1908 Summer Olympics
Cyclists at the 1912 Summer Olympics
Cyclists from Paris